Andrew Rabb House is a historic home located at German Township, Fayette County, Pennsylvania.  It was built in 1773, and is a -story, 5-bay, stone dwelling in a vernacular Georgian style. It measures 44 feet by 24 feet.  Andrew Rabb (c. 1740 – 1804) was a locally prominent and wealthy distiller who was significant in the Whiskey Rebellion in Fayette County.

It was added to the National Register of Historic Places in 1992.

References

Houses on the National Register of Historic Places in Pennsylvania
Houses completed in 1773
Georgian architecture in Pennsylvania
Houses in Fayette County, Pennsylvania
National Register of Historic Places in Fayette County, Pennsylvania
1773 establishments in Pennsylvania